Wendy Joy Coe (born 17 February 1942) is a New Zealand former cricketer who played as a right-handed batter and right-arm medium bowler. She appeared in three Test matches for New Zealand between 1966 and 1969. She played domestic cricket for Wellington.

References

External links
 
 

1942 births
Living people
Cricketers from Lower Hutt
New Zealand women cricketers
New Zealand women Test cricketers
Wellington Blaze cricketers